, is a Japanese model, singer, and television personality. Shiina debuted as a model in the fashion magazine Ranzuki in 2009. She modeled exclusively for the fashion magazine Popteen from 2010 to 2016.

In addition to modeling, Shiina debuted as an idol singer under the name , releasing her first single "Shinryaku Pikarin Densetsu" on December 12, 2012.

Career

Modeling career

During middle school, Shiina often watched anime and played video games at home due to frequently being suspended for violence, such as destroying property and throwing firecrackers. Shiina admitted at one point in her life, she had suicidal thoughts. After seeing an application for magazine models, she decided to apply to "shine somewhere." In 2009, Shiina began appearing in the fashion magazine Ranzuki as an amateur model, and subsequently began modeling for other gyaru fashion magazines such as Egg and Men's Egg. From 2010 to 2016, she modeled exclusively for the fashion magazine Popteen under the nickname "Pikarin." While modeling for Popteen, Shiina's cosplay photoshoots of anime characters went viral, notably during a time where there was no crossover between gyaru fashion and anime.

Music career

In 2012, Shiina made her singing debut under the name Pikarin Shiina and branded herself as an "idol from the Demon World." Shiina thought up her Pikarin persona while modeling for Popteen. She released her first single "Shinryaku Pikarin Densetsu" on December 12, 2012, which was used as an ending theme to the television program Happy Music. On October 16, 2013, Shiina released "Toro Amachu" as her second single, which was used as the theme song for Donyatsu, an anime series she also starred in. On May 21, 2014, Shiina released her first studio album, titled Shikkoku no Yami ni Somarishi Utagoe ga Kisama ni mo Kikoeru ka... This was followed up with the release of her second album, Makai no Owari, on August 26, 2015.

On May 3, 2016, Shiina released and wrote the lyrics for the song "Makai Shinjū", which was produced by Kenta Matsukura. The single was released with "Mitsu to Batsu" as a double A-side. On December 14, 2016, she released "Dogeza Road" on digital services as a collaboration song with Village Vanguard. On May 3, 2017, she released the song "Ba-Ba-Bah-Ba-Baumkuchen" as her fourth single, which was used as the ending theme to the television program Mutoma 2. The single included the song "Geboku Gebo Gebo!!" as a double A-side. On November 20, 2018, Shiina released her fifth single, "Fukanzen na Boku to Kanseisareta Kaisha", with "Hate! Hate! Hate!" as its leading track.

Publications

Photo books

Discography

Studio albums

Singles

Promotional singles

References

External links

1994 births
Living people
21st-century Japanese singers
21st-century Japanese women singers
Japanese female models
Japanese women pop singers
Japanese idols